Noora may refer to:

 Noora (given name), a Finnish female given name
 Noora (film), a 2002 film directed by Mahmoud Shoolizadeh
 Noora (vaccine), an Iranian COVID-19 vaccine candidate

See also 

 Noor (name), a common Arabic unisex name
 Noura